Austin Smith may refer to:

 Austin Gerard Smith (born 1960), British professor and director of the Living Systems Institute at the University of Exeter
 Austin Smith (field hockey) (born 1985), South African field hockey player
 Austin Smith (ice hockey) (born 1988), American ice hockey player
 Austin Smith (tennis) (born 1993), American tennis player
 Austin Smith (politician), Arizona State Representative